Senate elections were held in Zimbabwe on 26 November 2005 to elect members to the newly formed Zimbabwe Senate. There were a total of 3,239,574 registered voters, of which 631,347 or 19.5% voted. ZANU-PF won in a landslide election, received over 73% of the popular vote, in what was the nation's first senate elections. The elections were also boycotted by many members of the Movement for Democratic Change as a protest against the suspected election rigging of the 31 March parliamentary election earlier that year, which also saw a low voter turnout of 47.7%.

The decision by some in the MDC to contest the election led to the MDC splitting in two. After the split there was MDC T being led by Morgan Tsvangirai and MDC led by Welshman Ncube.

Results
On 29 November 2005 it was announced that President Mugabe had appointed Kantibhai Patel, Sheila Chipo Mahere, Peter Haritatos, Aguy Clement Georgias, Tazvitya Jonathan Mapfumo and Joshua Teke Malinga as Senators.

By constituency

Zimbabwe
2005 in Zimbabwe
Elections in Zimbabwe